Kuttur, also known as Kuttoor, is a census town in Thrissur district in the Indian state of Kerala. Kuttur is located 5–8 km from Thrissur town and is part of Kolazhy Grama Panchayat.

Demographics
 India census, Kuttur (CT) had a population of 12179.

References

Cities and towns in Thrissur district